Miikka Salomäki (born 9 March 1993) is a Finnish professional ice hockey forward currently playing with Lausanne HC of the National League (NL).

Playing career
Salomäki was drafted in the second round, 52nd overall. by the Nashville Predators at the 2011 NHL Entry Draft in St. Paul, Minnesota. He was their second pick in the draft, selected from playing with the Finnish Liiga with Oulun Kärpät. Salomäki was recalled to the Predators on 8 January 2015. He made his NHL debut and scored his first career NHL goal later that night against Kari Lehtonen of the Dallas Stars in a game where his team would go on to win 3–2 in overtime.

Heading into his seventh year within the Predators organization, Salomäki continued to play between the NHL and AHL, beginning the 2019–20 season with the Milwaukee Admirals. He was recalled and appeared in 5 games with Nashville before returning to the Admirals. After registering just 15 points through 41 games in the AHL, Salomäki's tenure with the Predators ended as he was traded to the Toronto Maple Leafs in exchange for Ben Harpur on 22 February 2020. He remained in the AHL joining the Maple Leafs' AHL affiliate, the Toronto Marlies, registering 2 goals and 4 points in 8 games before the season was cancelled due to the COVID-19 pandemic.

As a free agent from his brief tenure within the Maple Leafs organization, Salomäki returned to the Western Conference in agreeing to a one-year, two-way contract to join the Colorado Avalanche on 9 October 2020. After attending the Avalanche training camp for the pandemic delayed  season, Salomäki was among the last cuts assigned to AHL affiliate, the Colorado Eagles. He made 26 regular season appearances with the Eagles, adding just 2 goals and 12 points, while also spending time with the Avalanche as a part of the extended roster on the taxi squad and later as a black ace in the playoffs.

With his contract concluded with the Avalanche, Salomäki opted to leave North America as a free agent in agreeing to a two-year contract with Swedish club, Örebro HK of the Swedish Hockey League (SHL), on 23 June 2021. In the 2021–22 season, Salomäki in making with SHL debut, appeared in 34 regular season games, contributing with 3 goals and 11 points. At the tail end of the season, Salomäki left his contract early in returning to Finland and playing out the remainder of the season with HIFK of the Liiga on 28 February 2022. 

After a short playoff run with HIFK, Salomäki left his brief return in the Liiga in signing a two-year contract with Swiss club, Lausanne HC of the NL, on 10 June 2022.

Career statistics

Regular season and playoffs

International

References

External links
 

1993 births
Living people
Colorado Eagles players
Finnish ice hockey left wingers
HIFK (ice hockey) players
Lausanne HC players
Milwaukee Admirals players
Nashville Predators draft picks
Nashville Predators players
Örebro HK players
Oulun Kärpät players
People from Raahe
Toronto Marlies players
Sportspeople from North Ostrobothnia